Holy Ghost Catholic Church is a Catholic church at 1900 California Street in Denver, Colorado, United States.
The church was consecrated in 1943.
The church is managed by the Oblates of the Virgin Mary.

References

External links

 Holy Ghost Church Website
 Parish page on the website of the Archdiocese of Denver
 

Roman Catholic churches in Denver